Canoga may refer to:

Games
Canoga, a nickname for a card game called Shut the Box

Places
Canoga, New York, a hamlet located in Seneca County, New York
Canoga Park, California, a neighborhood located in Los Angeles, California